Funastrum clausum, commonly known as white twinevine, is a species of flowering plant in the dogbane family, Apocynaceae. It is native to southern Florida and Texas in the United States, Mexico, the Caribbean, Central America and South America as far south as Paraguay.

References

External links

Sarcostemma clausum at Atlas of Florida Vascular Plants
USDA PLANTS Database

Asclepiadoideae
Plants described in 1914
Flora of Bolivia
Flora of the Caribbean
Flora of Central America
Flora of Ecuador
Flora of Florida
Flora of Mexico
Flora of Paraguay
Flora of Peru
Flora of northern South America
Flora of Texas